Stephen Downey may refer to:

 Stephen Wheeler Downey (1839–1902), delegate to the United States House of Representatives from Wyoming Territory and "Father of the University of Wyoming"
 Stephen Downey (Canadian politician)

See also
Steve Downie (born 1987), Canadian ice hockey player